Men's single skating was contested during the figure skating events at the 2006 Winter Olympics.

This individual event was structured in a similar manner to the pairs event, with a short program and a free skating. 30 skaters entered the short program, but only the top 24 competitors continued to the free skating.

The 2002 Olympic champion Alexei Yagudin from Russia did not defend his title because he announced retirement in 2003. On the other hand, reigning World Champion Stéphane Lambiel from Switzerland did compete.

The clear favorite before the competition was three-time world champion Evgeni Plushenko, who withdrew from the 2005 World Championships due to injury. Reigning world champion Stéphane Lambiel was considered Plushenko's main competition for the gold. Other notable competitors coming into the event included Canadians Jeffrey Buttle (the reigning world silver medalist) and Emanuel Sandhu, France's Brian Joubert, Japan's Daisuke Takahashi, and the strong American team of Johnny Weir, Evan Lysacek (reigning world bronze medalist), and Matt Savoie.

Short program
The men's short program took place on February 14. Plushenko took the early lead after the short program. He set a new personal best (also the world record) score with a massive 90.66 points, over 10 points ahead of Weir, who finished in second with 80.00 points. Lambiel doubled his planned triple Axel but still ended up in third place with a score of 79.04 points, less than a point behind Weir. Joubert was fourth in the short program with 77.77 points, followed by Takahashi and Buttle with 73.77 and 73.29 points respectively. Buttle and fellow Canadian Sandhu, who ranked seventh, both had trouble with their jumps, but their high program component scores kept them in contention for medals. Savoie had a solid skate to finish eighth, while teammate Lysacek fell on his triple Axel and doubled his triple flip to finish a disappointing tenth in this phase of the competition.

Free skating
In the free skating, completed on February 16, Plushenko set another world record by garnering 167.67 points for his free skating. He started his program off with quad-triple-double and had only one flaw, doubling his triple flip. He finished with the highest technical and program component scores of the night.

Despite struggling with his jumps in his free skating (completing no triple Axels), Lambiel's opening quad combination and exquisite spins kept him in second overall, though he finished only fourth in the free skating. Buttle's free skating, although marred by a fall on his quad attempt, had the second highest program components scores which helped to finish him second in the free skating and third overall. Joubert had a crowd-pleasing free skating but made several jump errors and finished a disappointing seventh in the free skating, sixth overall.

The Americans got off to a strong start in the free skating led by Lysacek. He skated his best free of the year and landed two triple Axels, getting 152.28 points. This was the third best free of the night and a huge improvement from his short, moving him up to fourth overall. Weir omitted his planned quad toe and only had one jump combination, which left him short on technical content and in sixth place in the free skating. Overall, he finished right behind Lysacek in fifth. Savoie had a solid skate with gorgeous transitions and jumps, though he doubled his two final planned triples to finish fifth in the free and seventh overall.

Takahashi skated fairly strongly in his free but was penalized in the marking for repeating too many jumps and underrotating others. He finished ninth in the free and eighth overall. Belgium's Kevin van der Perren made huge leaps in the free with 132.03 points and moving up from thirteenth in the short to ninth overall. Sandhu, on the other hand, fell apart in his free skating, falling twice and popping a couple of jumps. His high program component scores couldn't keep him in the top ten. He finished thirteenth overall.

That year made Jeffery Buttle the only non-European man on the podium.

Results

Short program

Free skating

Final standings

Referee:
 Rita Zonnekeyn

Technical Controller:
 Fabio Bianchetti

Technical Specialist:
 Katerina Kamberska

Assistant Technical Specialist:
 Viktor Petrenko

Judges:
 Kenji Amako
 Hermann Schulz
 Mona Jonsson
 Patrick Ibens
 Alexander Penchev
 Raffaella Locatelli
 Jiang Yibing
 Nicolae Bellu
 Alexei Shirshov
 Philippe Meriguet
 Steve Winkler
 William Thompson

References

External links
 
 Men's Protocol
 https://www.nytimes.com/packages/html/sports/20060218_SKATEMENS_GRAPHIC/index.html

Men
2006 in figure skating
Men's events at the 2006 Winter Olympics